The 1982 All-Ireland Senior Camogie Championship Final was the 51st All-Ireland Final and the deciding match of the 1982 All-Ireland Senior Camogie Championship, an inter-county camogie tournament for the top teams in Ireland.

Cork defeated Dublin with a last-second Mary O'Leary goal.

References

All-Ireland Senior Camogie Championship Final
All-Ireland Senior Camogie Championship Final
All-Ireland Senior Camogie Championship Final, 1982
All-Ireland Senior Camogie Championship Finals
Cork county camogie team matches
Dublin county camogie team matches